Cabra is a large townland in County Down, Northern Ireland. It is in the parish of Clonduff and is situated approximately two miles from Hilltown, Rathfriland and Kilcoo. Cabra has a tradition of farming, with the three most common farming methods in Cabra being: sheep farming/breeding, crop growing (corn and barley) and cow farming/breeding.

"Townland stones" have been erected to keep Cabra in touch with its local heritage. Cabra has one primary school, St.Pauls; which has around 90 children attending. All together Cabra has around 150 residents living within its boundaries, with a small post office, one church, and a community hall.

See also
 Clonduff GAC

References 

Townlands of County Down